Megaphrynium is a genus of plants native to tropical Africa.

 species
 Megaphrynium distans Hepper, Kew Bull. 32: 461 (1968). - Ghana, Côte d'Ivoire, Liberia, Equatorial Guinea  
 Megaphrynium gabonense Koechlin, Fl. Gabon 9: 153 (1964). - Gabon, Congo Republic
 Megaphrynium macrostachyum (K.Schum.) Milne-Redh., Kew Bull. 7: 170 (1952). - from Sierra Leone to Uganda 
 Megaphrynium trichogynum Koechlin, Fl. Gabon 9: 154 (1964). - Central African Republic, Cameroon, Equatorial Guinea, Gabon, Congo Republic, Zaire
 Megaphrynium velutinum (K.Schum.) Koechlin, Fl. Gabon 9: 158 (1964). - Côte d'Ivoire, Cameroon, Equatorial Guinea, Gabon

References

Marantaceae
Zingiberales genera